Vehicles that are powered by fossil fuels, such as gasoline (petrol), diesel, kerosene, and fuel oil are set to be phased out. It is one of the three most important parts of the general fossil fuel phase-out process, the others being the phase-out of fossil fuel power plants for electricity generation and decarbonisation of industry.

Many countries and cities around the world have stated they will ban the sale of passenger vehicles (primarily cars and buses) powered by fossil fuels such as petrol, liquefied petroleum gas, and diesel at some time in the future. Synonyms for the bans include phrases like "banning gas cars", "banning petrol cars", "the petrol and diesel car ban", or simply "the diesel ban". Another method of phase-out is the use of zero-emission zones in cities.

A few places have set dates for banning other types of vehicles, such as fossil-fuelled ships and lorries.

Background 

Reasons for banning the further sale of fossil fuel vehicles include: reducing health risks from pollution particulates, notably diesel PM10s, and other emissions, notably nitrogen oxides; meeting national greenhouse gas, such as CO2, targets under international agreements such as the Kyoto Protocol and the Paris Agreement; or energy independence. The intent to ban vehicles powered by fossil fuels is attractive to governments as it offers a simpler compliance target, compared with a carbon tax or phase-out of fossil fuels.

The automotive industry is working to introduce electric vehicles to adapt to bans with varying success and it is seen by some in the industry as a possible source of money in a declining market. A 2020 study from the Eindhoven University of Technology showed that the manufacturing emissions of batteries of new electric cars are much smaller than what was assumed in the 2017 IVL study (around 75 kg /kWh) and that the lifespan of lithium batteries is also much longer than previously thought (at least 12 years with a mileage of 15,000 km annually): they are cleaner than internal combustion cars powered by diesel or petrol.

There is some opposition to simply moving from fossil-fuel-powered cars to electric cars, as they would still require a large proportion of urban land. On the other hand, there are many types of (electric) vehicles that take up little space, such as (cargo) bicycles and electric motorcycles and scooters. Making cycling and walking over short distances, especially in urban areas, more attractive and feasible with measures such as removing roads and parking spaces and improving cycling infrastructure and footpaths (including pavements), provides a partial alternative to replacing all fossil-fuelled vehicles with electric vehicles. Although there are as yet very few completely carfree cities (such as Venice), several are banning all cars in parts of the city, such as city centers.

Methods 
The banning of fossil-fuelled vehicles of a defined scope requires authorities to enact legislation that restricts them in a certain way. Proposed methods include:
 A prohibition on further sales or registration of new vehicles powered with specific fuels from a certain date in a certain area. At the date of implementation, existing vehicles would remain legal to drive on public highways.
 A prohibition on the importation of new vehicles powered with specific fuels from a certain date into a certain area. This is planned in countries such as Denmark, Israel, and Switzerland; However, some countries, such as Israel, have no legislation on the subject.
 A prohibition on any use of certain vehicles powered with specific fuels from a certain date within a certain area. Restrictions such as these are already in place in many European cities, usually in the context of their low-emission zones (LEZs).
 Making emission legislation so strict that it can in reality not be fulfilled.

Fuel cell (electric) vehicles (FCVs or FCEVs) also allow running on (some) non-fossil fuels (i.e., hydrogen, ethanol, methanol).

Cities generally use the introduction of low-emission zones (LEZs) or zero-emission zones (ZEZs), sometimes with an accompanying air quality certificate sticker such as Crit'air (France), to restrict the use of fossil-fuelled cars in some or all of its territory. These zones are growing in number, size, and strictness. Some city bans in countries such as Italy, Germany, and Switzerland are only temporarily activated during particular times of the day, during winter, or when there is a smog alert (for example, in Italy in January 2020); these do not directly contribute to the phase-out of fossil fuel vehicles, but they make owning and using such vehicles less attractive as their utility is restricted and the cost of driving them increases.

Some countries have given consumers various incentives such as subsidies or tax breaks to stimulate the purchase of electric vehicles, while fossil-fuelled vehicles are taxed increasingly heavily.

Helped by government incentives, Norway became the first country to have the majority of new vehicles sold in 2021 be electric. In January 2022, 88 percent of new vehicles sold in the country were electric, and based upon current trends, they would most likely hit the goal of no new fossil fuel cars being sold by 2025.

Places with planned fossil-fuel vehicle restrictions

International 
At the 2021 United Nations Climate Change Conference held in Glasgow multiple governments and companies signed a not legally binding declaration to accelerate the transition to 100% zero emission cars and vans (the Glasgow Declaration). They wanted all new cars and vans to not emit any greenhouse gas at the tailpipe by 2035 in leading markets and by 2040 globally. The United States and China (the biggest car markets) did not sign and neither did Germany (the biggest car market in the EU). Also absent from the list of signatories were major car manufacturers Volkswagen, Toyota, Renault-Nissan and Hyundai-Kia.

European Union 
In 2018, Denmark proposed an EU-wide prohibition on petrol and diesel cars, but that turned out to be contrary to EU regulations. In October 2019, Denmark made a proposal for phasing out fossil fuel vehicles on the member state level by 2030 which was supported by 10 other EU member states.
In July 2021, France opposed a ban on combustion-powered cars and in particular on hybrid vehicles.
In July 2021, the European Commission proposed a 100% reduction of emissions for new sales of cars and vans as of 2035. On 8 June 2022, the European Parliament voted in favour of the proposal of the European Commission, but agreement with the European Union member states was necessary before a final law could be passed. On 22 June 2022, German Finance Minister Christian Lindner stated that his government would refuse to agree on the ban. But on 29 June 2022, after 16 hours of negotiations, all climate ministers of the 27 EU member states agreed to the commission's proposal (part of the 'Fit for 55' package) to effectively ban the sale of new internal combustion vehicles by 2035 (through '[introducing] a 100%  emissions reduction target by 2035 for new cars and vans'). Germany backed the 2035 target, asking the Commission whether hybrid vehicles or -neutral fuels could also comply with the proposal; Frans Timmermans responded that the Commission kept an "open mind", but at the time 'hybrids did not deliver sufficient emissions cuts and alternative fuels were prohibitively expensive.'

Countries

Countries with proposed bans or implementing 100% sales of zero-emissions vehicles include China (including Hong Kong and Macau), Japan, Singapore, the UK, South Korea, Iceland, Denmark, Sweden, Norway, Slovenia, Germany, Italy, France, Belgium, the Netherlands, Portugal, Canada, the 12 U.S. states that adhered to California's Zero-Emission Vehicle (ZEV) Program, Sri Lanka, Cabo Verde, and Costa Rica.

Some politicians in some countries have made broad announcements but have implemented no legislation and therefore there is no phase-out and no binding legislation.  Ireland, for example, had made announcements but ultimately did not ban diesel nor petrol vehicles.

The International Energy Agency predicted in 2021 that 70% of India's new car sales will be fossil powered in 2030, despite earlier government announcements that were discarded in 2018. In November 2021, the Indian government was amongst 30 national governments and six major automakers who pledged to phase out the sale of all new petrol and diesel vehicles by 2040 worldwide, and by 2035 in "leading markets".

Cities and territories 

Some cities or territories have planned or taken measures to partially or entirely phase out fossil fuel vehicles earlier than their national governments. In some cases, this is achieved through local or regional government initiatives, in other cases through legal challenges brought on by citizens or civil organisations enforcing partial phase-outs based on the right to clean air.

Some cities listed have signed the Fossil Fuel Free Streets Declaration, committing to banning emitting vehicles by 2030, but this does not necessarily have the force of law in those jurisdictions. The bans typically apply to a select number of streets in the urban centre of the city where most people live, not to its entire territory. Some cities take a gradual approach to prohibit the most polluting categories of vehicles first, then the next-most polluting, all the way up to a complete ban on all fossil-fuel vehicles; some cities have not yet set a deadline for a complete ban, and/or are waiting for the national government to set such a date.

In California, emissions requirements for automakers to be permitted to sell any vehicles in the state were expected to force 15% of new vehicles offered for sale between 2018 and 2025 to be zero emission. Much cleaner emissions and increased efficiency in petrol engines mean this will be met with just 8% of ZEV vehicles. The "Ditching Dirt Diesel" law SB 44 sponsored by Nancy Skinner and adopted on 20 September 2019 requires the California Air Resources Board (CARB) to "create a comprehensive strategy for deploying medium- and heavy-duty vehicles" to make California meet federal ambient air quality standards, and 'establish goals and spur technology advancements for reducing GHG emissions from the medium- and heavy-duty vehicle sectors by 2030 and 2050'. It stops short of directly requiring a phase-out of all diesel vehicles by 2050 (as the original bill did), but it would be the most obvious means of achieving the reduction goals. In August of 2022, California Governor Gavin Newsom signed off on a new EV mandate. The plan's targets are 35% ZEV market share by 2026, 68% by 2030, and 100% by 2035. This plan is accompanied by supporting funding for infrastructure and ZEV rebates totaling $10 billion. Newsom has stated his commitment to keep California at the forefront of zero-emission transportation.

In the European Union, Council Directive 96/62/EC on ambient air quality assessment and management and Directive 2008/50/EC on ambient air quality form the legal basis for EU citizens' right to clean air. On 25 July 2008 in the case Dieter Janecek v Freistaat Bayern CURIA, the European Court of Justice ruled that under Directive 96/62/EC citizens have the right to require national authorities to implement a short-term action plan that aims to maintain or achieve compliance to air quality limit values. The ruling of the German Federal Administrative Court in Leipzig on 5 September 2013 significantly strengthened the right of environmental associations and consumer protection organisations to sue local authorities to enforce compliance with air quality limits throughout an entire city. The Administrative Court of Wiesbaden declared on 30 June 2015 that financial or economic aspects were not a valid excuse to refrain from taking measures to ensure that the limit values were observed, the Administrative Court of Düsseldorf ruled on 13 September 2016 that driving bans on certain diesel vehicles were legally possible to comply with the limit values as quickly as possible, and on 26 July 2017, the Administrative Court of Stuttgart ordered the state of Baden-Württemberg to consider a year-round ban on diesel-powered vehicles. By mid-February 2018, citizens in the EU member states the Czech Republic, France, Germany, Hungary, Italy, Romania, Slovakia, Spain, and the United Kingdom were suing their governments for violating the limit of 40 micrograms per cubic meter of breathable air as stipulated in the Ambient Air Quality Directive.

A landmark ruling by the German Federal Administrative Court in Leipzig on 27 February 2018 declared that the cities of Stuttgart and Düsseldorf were allowed to legally prohibit older, more polluting diesel vehicles from driving in zones worst affected by pollution, rejecting appeals made by German states against the bans imposed by the two cities' local courts. The case was strongly influenced by the ongoing Volkswagen emissions scandal (also known as Dieselgate), which in 2015 revealed that many Volkswagen diesel engines were deceptively tested and marketed as much cleaner than they were. The decision was predicted to set a precedent for other places in the country and in Europe. Indeed, the ruling triggered a wave of dozens of local diesel restrictions, brought about by Environmental Action Germany (DUH) suing city authorities and winning legal challenges across Germany. While some groups and parties such as the AfD again tried to overturn them, others such as the Greens advocated for a national phaseout of diesel cars by 2030. On 13 December 2018, the European Court of Justice overturned a 2016 European Commission relaxation of car  emission limits to 168 mg/km, which the Court declared illegal. This allowed the cities of Brussels, Madrid, and Paris, who had filed the complaint, to proceed with their plans to also reject Euro 6 diesel vehicles from their urban centres, based on the original 80 mg/km limit set by EU law.

Manufacturers with planned fossil-fuel vehicle phase-out roadmaps 

In 2017, Volvo announced plans to phase out internal combustion-only vehicle production by 2019, after which all new cars manufactured by Volvo will either be fully electric or electric hybrids. In 2020, the Volvo Group with other truck makers including DAF Trucks, Daimler AG, Ford, Iveco, MAN SE, and Scania AB pledged to end diesel truck sales by 2040.

In 2018, Volkswagen Group's strategy chief said "the year 2026 will be the last product start on a combustion engine platform" for its core brand, Volkswagen.

In 2021, General Motors announced plans to go fully electric by 2035. In the same year, the CEO of Jaguar Land Rover, Thierry Bolloré also claimed it would "achieve zero tailpipe emissions by 2036" and that its Jaguar brand would be electric-only by 2025. By March, Volvo Cars announced that by 2030 it "intends to only sell fully electric cars and phase out any car in its global portfolio with an internal combustion engine, including hybrids". In April 2021, Honda announced that it will stop selling gas-powered vehicles by 2040. In July 2021, Mercedes-Benz announced that its new vehicle platforms will be EV-only by 2025. In Oct 2021, Rolls-Royce announced that it will be fully electric by 2030. In November 2021, at 2021 United Nations Climate Change Conference, car manufacturers including BYD Auto, Ford Motor Company, General Motors, Jaguar, Land Rover, Mercedes-Benz and Volvo have committed to "work towards all sales of new cars and vans being zero emission globally by 2040, and by no later than 2035 in leading markets".

In 2022, Maserati announced its plans to offer full-electric variants of all its models by 2025 and its intention to halt production of combustion engine vehicles by 2030.

Railways
While railway electrification is often pursued for reasons unrelated to the emissions caused by fossil fuels, there has been an increased push in the 21st century to replace diesel locomotives with alternatives such as battery electric multiple units, hydrogen fuel trains like the Alstom Coradia iLint or overhead wire electrification. To date the only (non-micro- or city-state) country to have electrified its entire mainline railway network, Switzerland, pursued this phase-out of fossil fuel vehicles before the term or concept existed in the modern form, in large part because importing coal for steam locomotives had proven difficult during the World Wars but Switzerland has plenty of domestic hydropower resources to power electric trains. Israel Railways which had no electrified mainline rail services prior to 2018 when the Tel Aviv-Jerusalem railway became the first line to see electric train operation, plans to electrify most or all of its network and to phase out diesel locomotives and diesel multiple units. The project was further accelerated in 2020 as the temporary shutdown of rail traffic due to the COVID-19 pandemic in Israel allowed faster construction and ERTMS level 2 was being rolled out. However, in 2019 Israel Railways ordered diesel powered rolling stock to replace the ageing IC3 trains with media reports citing delays in the electrification program as the main reason. In California's bay area, the Caltrain Electrification program approved in 2016 is nearing completion. Despite having no electric locomotives previously, Caltrain's infrastructure has successfully implemented electric support. Funding was awarded in 2018, and train assembly and testing completed in 2022. In a multi-stage phase out plan, the new electric train cars will supplement and eventually replace diesel powered locomotives by 2024.

Shipping

Emissions will be banned from Norway's World Heritage Sites Geirangerfjord and Nærøyfjord from 2026.

Besides boats driven by batteries or indeed trolley boats, there have been several attempts to adapt nuclear marine propulsion which has been a part of the military naval forces of many countries for decades in the form of nuclear submarines, nuclear aircraft carriers and nuclear icebreakers to civilian uses. While prototypes like Otto Hahn (ship) (German) NS Savannah (American) and RV Mirai (Japan) were built, the only non-icebreaker nuclear powered ship to remain in civilian service is the Russian Sevmorput built in the late 1980s by the Soviet Union. The Soviet Union and its successor state Russia also maintains a fleet of nuclear icebreakers to keep the Northern Sea Route open.

Sail ships and oars rely on renewable resources rather than fossil fuels (wind and human muscle-power respectively) but have disadvantages in terms of speed and labour-costs and have thus been phased out of virtually all commercial uses. There are some attempts to use wind-powered ships for commercial purposes, but as of 2022 they have remained marginal.

Aviation 

Norway, and possibly some other Scandinavian countries, are aiming for all domestic flights to be emission-free by 2040. A major obstacle to decarbonising air travel is the low energy density of current and foreseeable battery technology. Thus alternatives to electric planes such as so called sustainable aviation fuels or e-fuels (fuels derived from electrochemical conversion of substances like water and carbon dioxide into hydrocarbons) are also proposed as a future replacement of current jet fuels. In 2021 the first production scale plant for e-fuels to be used in aviation opened in northern Germany. Production capacity is planned to reach 8 barrels a day by 2022. Lufthansa will be among the chief users of the synthetic fuel produced in the new facility. Germany's plan to transform aviation to net zero carbon emissions relies heavily on e-fuels.

Besides the need to rapidly scale up currently minuscule production capacity, the main obstacles to wider deployment of sustainable aviation fuels and e-Fuels are their much higher cost in the absence of meaningful carbon pricing in aviation. Furthermore, with current CORSIA regulations for sustainable aviation fuels allowing up to 90% of emissions compared to conventional fuels, even those options are currently far from carbon neutral.

There were attempts at building Nuclear-powered aircraft during the Cold War, which unlike nuclear marine propulsion never got very far and were always only proposed for military uses. As of 2022 no country or private enterprise is seriously pursuing nuclear propulsion for passenger aircraft.

However, short haul, low demand routes can be easily flown using electric aircraft, and manufacturers such as Heart Aerospace are planning to introduce them with United Airlines in 2026.

Unintended side-effects

Second-hand vehicle dumping 

From the European Union, there is already an export market which includes millions of used cars which are sent to Eastern Europe and the Caucasus, central Asia and Africa. According to UNECE, the global on-road vehicle fleet is to double by 2050 (from 1.2 billion to 2.5 billion, see introduction), with most future car purchases taking place in developing countries. Some experts predict that the number of vehicles in developing countries will increase by 4 or 5-fold by 2050 (compared to current car use levels), and that the majority of these will be second-hand. There are currently no global or even regional agreements that rationalise and govern the flow of second-hand vehicles. Others say that new electric 2-wheelers may sell widely in developing countries as they are affordable.

Internal combustion engine cars that may no longer comply to local environmental standards are exported to developing countries, where legislation on vehicle emissions is often less strict. In addition, in some developing countries, such as Uganda, the average age of a car imported is already 16.5 years and it will likely be driven for another 20 years. In such cases, fuel efficiency levels of these vehicles become worse as they age. In addition, national vehicle inspection requirements vary widely depending on the country.

Potential solutions 
 Export prohibitions: Some propose that the European Union could implement a rule that does not allow the most polluting cars to leave the EU. The European Union itself is of the opinion that it "should stop exporting its waste outside of the EU" and it will therefore "revisit the rules on waste shipments and illegal exports".
 Import prohibitions: This includes used vehicle bans, used vehicle import age limits, taxation and inspection tests as a precondition to vehicle registration.
Convert fossil fuel vehicles to electric: , this is expensive, so it tends to only be done for classic cars.
 Mandatory recycling: The European Commission is considering plans to introduce rules on mandatory recycled content in specific product groups for packaging, vehicles, construction materials and batteries, for instance. The EU announced a new Circular Economy Action Plan in March 2020, and it mentioned that the Commission will also propose to revise the rules on end-of-life vehicles with a view to promoting more circular business models.
 Scrappage programs: Governments can offer a premium to owners to have their fossil fuel vehicles voluntarily scrapped and to buy a cleaner vehicle from that money (if they so choose). For example, the city of Ghent offers a scrapping premium of €1,000 for diesel vehicles and €750 for petrol vehicles; as of December 2019, the city had allocated €1.2 million for this purpose to the scrapping fund.

Mobility transition

In Germany, activists have coined the term Verkehrswende (mobility transition, analogous to "Energiewende", energy transition) for a project of not only changing the motive power of cars (from fossil fuels to renewable power sources) but the entire mobility system to one of walkability, complete streets, public transit, electrified railways and bicycle infrastructure.

There is similar research being done in the United States around the term mobility justice. Geologist Dr. Jason Henderson of University of California, San Francisco argues that supporting electric vehicles while neglecting compact city design and public transportation will lead to car-oriented city design. This comes with numerous sustainability issues that disproportionately affect disadvantaged communities such as environmental gentrification, less low-income housing, and unequal access to the benefits of electric vehicle adoption. In addition, the production of electric vehicles can come at the price of laborers in other countries, and the environmental costs there are seldom taken into account when calculating the environmental benefits of electric vehicles. According to mobility justice critiques, relying primarily on electric vehicles for the phase out of fossil fuels comes at an opportunity cost of investing in other types of sustainable transportation such as bike lanes, safe walking spaces, electric trains, and electric buses.

See also 
 Fuel substitution: central lever to be deployed in decarbonising transport
 Alternative fuel vehicle: many of which use an internal combustion engine
 Directive 2008/50/EC, a 2010 EU directive limiting NO2 emissions, which is the subject of many legal challenges across Europe
 Electric vehicle conversion: removing the engine of an internal combustion-powered vehicle and replacing it with an electric motor, creating reduced manufacturing emissions (as most car parts are reused) and costs compared to manufacturing/buying a new one
 Electrofuel: a type of synthetic fuel made from electricity (e.g., made using wind, water or solar power), many of which can be burnt in internal combustion engines
 Environmental impact of aviation
 Flexible-fuel vehicle and dual-fuel vehicle: have an internal combustion engine and can run on multiple fuels, sometimes even combining renewable/bio fuels and fossil fuels
 Fossil fuel lobby
 Fuel cell vehicle: vehicles that generate electricity using oxygen from the air and compressed hydrogen
 Hydrogen internal combustion engine vehicle: burns hydrogen in an internal combustion engine
 Leapfrogging
 Smart mobility
 Short-haul flight ban

Notes

References 

Energy-related lists
Health-related lists
Low-carbon economy
Technological change
Technological phase-outs
2020s in transport
Electric vehicles